John Goodwin (14 March 1859 – 15 February 1938) was a Welsh sports shooter. He competed for Great Britain in the men's trap event at the 1912 Summer Olympics.

References

1859 births
1938 deaths
Welsh male sport shooters
Olympic shooters of Great Britain
Shooters at the 1912 Summer Olympics
Sportspeople from Powys
British male sport shooters